Nallanatti is a village in Belagavi district of Karnataka, India.

References
Nallanatti is a village which is located at near GOKAK taluk belagavi district.And also Gathaprabha river is passing through this village.

Nallanatti village having Gramapanchayat And also syndicate bank.

The most important crop is sugar cane and is having more than 30 small scale sugarcane jaggery plants.

Villages in Belagavi district